Tom Jones is a comédie mêlée d'ariettes, a kind of opéra comique, by the French composer and chess champion  François-André Danican Philidor which first appeared at the Comédie-Italienne, Paris, on 27 February 1765. Its French libretto, by Antoine-Alexandre-Henri Poisenet and Bertin Davesne, is loosely based on the 1749 novel by Henry Fielding.

The opera was initially a failure but Philidor had the libretto revised by Michel-Jean Sedaine and this new version, first performed on 30 January 1766, proved one of the most popular opéras comiques of the late 18th century. It was produced in a number of other countries, and translated into German, Swedish and Russian.

Roles

{| class="wikitable"
!Role
!Voice type
!Premiere cast, 27 February 1765
|-
|Monsieur Western
| bass
| Joseph Caillot
|-
|Madame Western, his sister
|mezzo-soprano
| Bérard
|-
|Sophie, his daughter
|soprano
| Desglands
|-
|Honora, her companion
|soprano
| Marie-Thérèse Laruette-Villette
|-
|Allworthy, their neighbour
|baritone
| Antoine Trial
|-
|Tom Jones, his ward
| tenor
| Clairval (Jean-Baptiste Guignard)
|-
|Blifil, Allworthy's nephew
| tenor
| Jean-Louis Laruette

|-
|Quaker Dowling
| spoken
|
|-
|}

Recordings
François-André Danican Philidor: Tom Jones, Lausanne Opera and Le Sinfonietta de Lausanne
Conductor: Jean-Claude Malgoire
Principal singers: Sébastien Droy, Sophie Marin-Degor, Marc Barrard, Sibyl Zanganelli, Carine Séchehaye, Rodolphe Briand, Léonard Pezzino & Guillaume Michel
Recording date: staged in 2005; recorded on 17, 18 and 20 janvier, 2006
Label: Dynamic 33509 (DVD), CDS509 (CD)

Sources

 
 Rushton, Julian (1992), "Tom Jones (i)" in The New Grove Dictionary of Opera, ed. Stanley Sadie (London) 
 The Viking Opera Guide'', ed. Amanda Holden (1993)

Comédies mêlées d'ariettes
Opéras comiques
French-language operas
Operas
1765 operas
Operas by François-André Danican Philidor
Operas set in London
Operas set in England
Adaptations of works by Henry Fielding